Ross Miner (born January 24, 1991) is an American skating coach and retired competitive figure skater. He is the 2012 Four Continents bronze medalist, 2009 JGP Final bronze medalist, 2013 and 2018 U.S. national silver medalist and 2009 U.S. junior champion. In 2021, Miner was suspended from coaching for six months by the United States Center for SafeSport, for sexual harassment.

Personal life 
Ross Miner was born in Burlington, Vermont. In addition to figure skating, he also played hockey until the age of 12. Miner moved from Williston, Vermont, to Watertown, Massachusetts, when he was 12. He takes on-line courses from the University of Missouri.

Career

Early career
Ross Miner began skating at the age of three. When he was 12, he began training at the Skating Club of Boston. He had to relearn much from scratch as his jump technique was extremely poor at the beginning – underrotating even single Axels; nevertheless, Mark Mitchell and Peter Johansson agreed to coach him. 

In the 2004–05 season, Miner competed on the Intermediate level. He won the bronze medal at his regional championship to qualify for the U.S. Junior Championships, where he placed eighth. He remained on the intermediate level during the following season. He won the silver medal at his regional championship to qualify for the U.S. Junior Championships, where he won the gold medal.

In the 2006–07 season, Miner moved up to the Novice level. He won his regional championship and then placed fifth at his sectional championship, missing qualifying for the 2007 U.S. Championships by one position.

In the 2007–08 season, Miner remained on the Novice level. He won his sectional championship to qualify for the 2008 U.S. Championships, where he won the silver medal. Following the U.S. Championships, Miner was assigned to the 2008 Gardena Spring Trophy, where he won the silver medal on the Junior level.

In the 2008–09 season, Miner moved up to the Junior level nationally. He won his sectional championships to qualify for the 2009 U.S. Championships. At Nationals, Miner won the short program and placed second in the free skate to win the gold medal overall.

Following the event, Miner was named to the team to the 2009 World Junior Championships, where he placed tenth.

Miner won the bronze medal at the 2009–10 Junior Grand Prix Final. He had qualified to compete at the senior level at the 2010 U.S. Nationals but suffered a high ankle sprain while practicing a triple Axel. He was forced to withdraw from the event and also missed the Junior Worlds that season.

Senior career
During the 2010–11 season, Miner finished ninth at 2010 NHK Trophy and seventh at 2010 Cup of China. He made his senior national debut at the 2011 U.S. Championships where he won the bronze medal. He was selected to compete at the 2011 World Championships, where he finished eleventh. During the off-season, he worked on a quad Salchow and shortening the lead time into his jumps.

Miner finished fifth at the 2012 Skate Canada International. At the 2012 NHK Trophy, he landed his first quad Salchow in competition and took the bronze medal. At the 2013 U.S. Championships, Miner finished second, behind champion Max Aaron.

Miner was ninth at the 2013 Skate Canada International. He withdrew from his other Grand Prix event, the 2013 Trophee Eric Bompard, due to a right ankle sprain. He was seventh at the 2014 U.S. Championships.

Miner began the 2014–15 season competing on the Challenger circuit, winning the silver medal at the 2014 US Classic and gold at the 2014 Autumn Classic. He was eighth at his lone Grand Prix assignment, the 2014 NHK Trophy, and finished sixth at the 2015 U.S. Championships.

Starting the 2015–16 season again at the U.S. Classic, Miner won the bronze medal.  On the Grand Prix, Miner was seventh at Skate America before winning the bronze medal with personal best scores at the 2015 Rostelecom Cup.  He was fifth at the 2016 U.S. Championships, but was nevertheless named to the American team for the 2016 Four Continents Championships, finishing fourteenth.

Miner was sixth at the 2016 U.S. Classic, before finishing twelfth at the 2016 Skate Canada International and ninth at the 2016 Cup of China.  He was fifth at the 2017 U.S. Championships.

To begin what would be his final competitive season, Miner finished sixth at the Autumn Classic.  He was given a second Challenger assignment, and placed fifth at the Finlandia Trophy. Given one Grand Prix assignment, he was sixth at the 2017 Skate America.  In his final competition, Miner had a striking return to form at the 2018 U.S. Championships.  Only sixth in the short program, he was second in the free skate, and took the silver medal.  Despite his second-place finish, Miner was not named to the American team for the 2018 Winter Olympics in PyeongChang, with the second and third spots on the team going to bronze medalist Vincent Zhou and pewter medalist Adam Rippon. This selection process was controversial, and Miner's coach Mark Mitchell criticized the US Federation publicly.

Coaching
Following his retirement from competition, Miner worked as a figure skating coach in Boston. In 2021, Miner was suspended from coaching for six months by the United States Center for SafeSport, for sexual harassment. On March 31, 2022, the United States Center for SafeSport suspended Miner for another three months for Abuse of Process.

Programs

Competitive highlights

2006–present 
GP: Grand Prix; CS: Challenger Series; JGP: Junior Grand Prix

Juvenile to intermediate levels

Detailed results 
Small medals for short and free programs awarded only at ISU Championships.

Junior level 

Small medals for short and free programs awarded only at ISU Championships. Previous ISU world best highlighted in bold.

References

External links

  Ross Miner official website
 
 Ross Miner at IceNetwork

American male single skaters
1991 births
Living people
Sports controversies
Sportspeople from Burlington, Vermont
Four Continents Figure Skating Championships medalists